Fated to Love You  may refer to:

 Fated to Love You (2008 TV series), a Taiwanese television series
 Fated to Love You (2014 TV series), a South Korean television series
 You're My Destiny (2017 TV series), a Thai television series